Pink Floyd in Venice: A Concert for Europe was a 1989 live performance by the British rock band Pink Floyd during their Momentary Lapse of Reason tour, staged on a floating barge on the Grand Canal in Venice, Italy.

Counted among the most extraordinary and controversial rock concerts ever held in Italy, it took place on 15 July 1989 on the traditional Redeemer festival (festa del Redentore) at the presence of some 200,000 spectators positioned on the banks and boats of the St. Mark's basin. It was broadcast by RAI worldwide with an audience of about 100 million viewers.

History 

After the concerts at Arena of Verona, Monza, Livorno, and Cava de' Tirreni in May 1989, the Venetian producer Francesco 'Fran' Tomasi proposed that Pink Floyd close their tour in Italy with a free concert in his city on the night of 15 July 1989, during the traditional festa del Redentore.

Initially it was planned to set up the stage, twenty-four metres high, on the extreme tip of the island of Giudecca, but for reasons of space it was decided to use some large rafts moored in the middle of San Marco basin, in front of the Doge's Palace.

The announcement of the event was spread in the beginning of April 1989, triggering a bitter polemical debate in the following three months, particularly concerning the city's decorum and the fear that the excessive volume of the music could damage its artistic heritage. The Superintendency of Cultural Heritage therefore set a limit of only 60 decibels so as not to damage the Byzantine mosaics of St. Mark's basilica (although peaks of up to 92 decibels were recorded during the concert); they also prohibited the installation of temporary chemical toilets for aesthetic reasons.

Polemics also hit the political scene, where there were different factions: on the one hand, there were supporters of the initiative such as the Venetian deputy prime minister  Gianni De Michelis (who wanted to nominate Venice as the venue for Expo 2000) and the Municipal councillor for culture Nereo Laroni; and on the other hand, opponents such as exponents of the Christian Democracy party. The municipal administration remained undecided for a long time, but in the end the deputy mayor Cesare De Piccoli signed the authorization for the concert (the mayor Antonio Casellati refused in fact to do it), just one hour before the beginning of the concert and only for reasons of public order, since the city had been invaded by a huge audience that had arrived since the previous evening thanks to special trains and charter flights from all over Europe.

The cost of the event was financed with one billion Italian lire by RAI, who broadcast the concert worldwide, including the Soviet Union (on a delayed basis) and simultaneously in the two Germanies; the rest of the expenses (several hundred millions lire) were covered by Pink Floyd themselves. It is estimated that worldwide, the concert was watched by 100 million spectators, 27 million of them in the United States (where the event was broadcast on cable for the price of ten dollars). In Italy, the concert was seen by over 3.5 million viewers, with an audience share of 30%.

For technical reasons, due to the TV live broadcasting requirements, the availability of satellites for world-wide viewing, and commercial advertising, the concert was limited to only 90 minutes, with some songs cut from the original setlist or eliminated altogether: only 14 songs were played instead of the 23 scheduled on the original tour.

The closing of the concert was marked by the traditional large fireworks show of the Redeemer festival, that registered an intensity of 107 decibels, thus exceeding the limits allowed for the concert.

After the concert, the polemics increased due to the large amount of rubbish (around three 300 tonnes of rubbish and 500 cubic metres of cans and empty bottles) left on the ground by the audience: the local municipal company for urban hygiene (AMIU) decided, however, to start collecting the rubbish only two days later, on the afternoon of the following Monday, while later the Italian Army also had asked to intervene in support. Another controversy concerned the alleged vandalism around the city, but the only damage recorded was a marker on a column of the Doge's Palace (compensated by the organisation with few hundred euro), and the smashing of a bar window in protest at the excessive rise in food prices (bottled water had been put on sale for 10.000 lire). Due the incessant polemics, which even led to parliamentary questioning, the red-green municipal council was forced to resign on 24 July, although shortly afterwards the municipal council re-elected a new council, largely identical to the previous one and renamed by the local press as the 'photocopy council'.

Band

Pink Floyd 
 David Gilmour – lead vocals, lead guitars, console steel guitar on "The Great Gig In The Sky"
 Nick Mason – drums, percussion
 Richard Wright – keyboards, backing vocals, harmony vocals

Additional musicians 
 Jon Carin – keyboards, sound effects, vocals, additional percussion
 Scott Page – saxophones, oboe, additional guitars
 Guy Pratt – bass guitar, vocals
 Tim Renwick – guitars, backing vocals
 Gary Wallis – percussion, additional keyboards
 Rachel Fury – backing vocals
 Durga McBroom – backing vocals
 Lorelei McBroom – backing vocals

Setlist 

 "Shine On You Crazy Diamond, Part I"
 "Learning to Fly"
 "Yet Another Movie"
 "Round and Around"
 "Sorrow" (shortened outro)
 "The Dogs of War"
 "On the Turning Away"
 "Time"
 "The Great Gig in the Sky"
 "Wish You Were Here"
 "Money" (shortened)
 "Another Brick in the Wall, Part 2"
 "Comfortably Numb"
 "Run Like Hell"

Legacy 
The Venetian reggae band Pitura Freska dedicated the song Pin Floi, fourth track of 1991 album 'Na bruta banda. Becomed a milestone in Venetian dialect songs, the song tells the personal experience of singer Sir Oliver Skardy who was unable to reach the concert area due to the great confusion and the local public transport strike called on the day of the concert.

In 2014, in the former church of St. Mary in the Port of Venice, the exhibition The Night of Wonders. Venezia 15 luglio 1989-2014 (letteralmente La notte delle meraviglie) was set up to celebrate the 25th anniversary of the concert.

References

Bibliography

Filmography 
 Pink Floyd, "A Concert For Europe" - Pink Floyd à Venezia - Live in Venice, July 15, 1989.

Music in Venice
Music events
1989 in music
Events in Venice
Pink Floyd